Toll-like receptor 6 is a protein that in humans is encoded by the TLR6 gene. TLR6 is a transmembrane protein, member of toll-like receptor family, which belongs to the pattern recognition receptor (PRR) family. TLR6 acts in a heterodimer form with toll-like receptor 2 (TLR2). Its ligands include multiple diacyl lipopeptides derived from gram-positive bacteria and mycoplasma and several fungal cell wall saccharides. After dimerizing with TLR2, the NF-κB intracellular signalling pathway is activated, leading to a pro-inflammatory cytokine production and activation of innate immune response. TLR6 has also been designated as CD286 (cluster of differentiation 286).

Function 

The protein encoded by this gene is a member of the toll-like receptor (TLR) family which plays a fundamental role in pathogen recognition and activation of innate immunity. TLRs are highly conserved from Drosophila to humans and share structural and functional similarities. They recognize pathogen-associated molecular patterns (PAMPs) that are expressed on infectious agents, and mediate the production of cytokines necessary for the development of effective immunity. The various TLRs exhibit different patterns of expression. This receptor functionally interacts with toll-like receptor 2 (TLR2) to mediate cellular response to gram-positive bacteria, mycoplasma, fungi, some viruses and even protozoa.

Interactions 

TLR6 has been shown to interact in a heterodimer form with TLR2. Synergistic interactions of TLR2/6 and TLR9 leading to higher resistance against lung infection have also been reported.

Agonists

Unlike TLR2/1 heterodimer, which recognizes triacylated lipopeptides, the TLR2/6 heterodimer is known to be specific for diacylated lipopeptides such as lipoteichoic acid, found on the cell wall of gram-positive bacteria or macrophage-activating lipopeptide (MALP2), found on the cell membrane of mycoplasma. It is also known that TLR2/6 binds some viral products, among them hepatitis C core and NS3 protein from the hepatitis C virus and glycoprotein B from cytomegalovirus. Several fungal ligands such as glucuronoxylomannan, phospholipomannan and zymosan have been reported. Moreover, TLR2/6 is known to bind one protozoan ligand – lipopeptidophosphoglycan. TLR2/6 can also be activated by synthetic lipopeptides, such as Pam2CSK4 or Fibroblast–stimulating lipopeptide (FSL-1).

Signalling
After ligand recognition, TLR6 receptor dimerizes with TLR2. Ligand-mediated dimerization is crucial for recruiting the adaptor proteins, which are necessary for transmitting the signal inside the cell. TLR2/6 heterodimer, just as most of the Toll-like receptors, generally induces MyD88-dependent intracellular signalling pathway, which leads to nuclear translocation of nuclear factor-κB (NF-κB), resulting in the production of pro-inflammatory cytokines. But MyD88 also activates mitogen‐activated protein kinases (MAPKs). However, several strains of lactic acid bacteria have been reported to stimulate immune regulation via TLR2/6, leading to tolerogenic interleukin 10 secretion, instead of pro-inflammatory cytokine secretion.

Expression

In human, TLR6 is highly expressed in appendix, spleen and lymph node. Among the immune cells, TLR6 has been detected in conventional dendritic cells, monocytes, macrophages, microglia, neutrophils, NK cells and B lymphocytes.

Clinical significance

A 359T>C single-nucleotide polymorphism (SNP) in the extracellular leucine rich repeat domain is associated with susceptibility to Legionnaires’ Disease. Increased occurrence of asthma in some populations may be associated with Ser249Pro polymorphism, also present in the extracellular domain of the encoded protein. On the other hand, a protective SNP also exists - S249P is possibly liked to protection from bronchial asthma and resistance from asthma in children.

References

Further reading

External links 
 
 
 
 
 

Clusters of differentiation
6